Sundown is a 2016 Mexican-American comedy film directed by Fernando Lebrija and starring Devon Werkheiser.

Plot
Two high school seniors, Logan (Devon Werkheiser) and Blake (Sean Marquette) travel to Puerto Vallarta in Mexico, where they hope to get together with their school crushes. However, they end up having to spend spring break trying to find a local girl who stole one of their father's Rolex wristwatches.

Cast
Devon Werkheiser as Logan
Sean Marquette as Blake
Camilla Belle as Gaby / Jessica
Silverio Palacios as Chuy
Jordi Mollà as Dorian
Sara Paxton as Lina Hunter
Teri Hatcher as Janice
John Michael Higgins as Kent
Reid Ewing as Eugene
Alejandro Edda as Pancho the Cop

Reception
The film received mostly negative reviews from the few critics who saw the film. It currently has a 9% rating on Rotten Tomatoes. Brian Orndorf from Blu-ray.com wrote a negative review, claiming: "Lebrija wants to make a heartfelt statement on love and passion, but he's picked the wrong subgenre to express his sincerity, leaving "Sundown" uneven and eventually out of gas." Aaron Peterson from The Hollywood Outsider gave the film a positive review, stating: "[Sundown] is a playful film with a strong cast and a bombastic soundtrack. It might not be the best Spring Break comedy ever, but this is a party you don't want to miss."

References

External links
 
 

American comedy films
Mexican comedy films
2016 comedy films
2010s English-language films
2010s American films
2010s Mexican films